Cicadettana calliope is a species of cicada in the family Cicadidae, found in North America. The species was formerly a member of the genus Cicadetta.

Life Cycle
Their median total life cycle length is around four years, this being from egg to a natural adult death.

Subspecies
These two subspecies belong to the species Cicadetta calliope:
 Cicadetta calliope calliope (Walker, 1850)
 Cicadetta calliope floridensis (Davis, 1920)

References

Further reading

External links

 

Articles created by Qbugbot
Insects described in 1850
Cicadettini